Steven D. Schroeder (born June 12, 1977) is an American poet and editor.

Life
He was born in San Francisco and grew up in California, Germany, and Colorado. He graduated from Vanderbilt University with a creative writing degree. His first full-length book of poems, Torched Verse Ends, appeared in 2009 from BlazeVOX Books. His second full-length book, The Royal Nonesuch, was published in 2013 by Spark Wheel Press and won the Devil's Kitchen Reading Award from Southern Illinois University. Wikipedia Apocalyptica was published by swallow::tale press in 2022.

His writing has appeared in New England Review, Crazyhorse, Michigan Quarterly Review, The Journal, Crab Orchard Review, Verse, Beloit Poetry Journal, Barrow Street, Pleiades, The Laurel Review, The National Poetry Review (where he won the Laureate Prize), and Verse Daily.

He has served as a board member, reading series co-director, and contributing editor for River Styx. He previously co-curated the Observable Reading Series, as well as edited the online journal Anti- and the print journal The Eleventh Muse. He works in marketing and lives in St. Louis.

Works
 
 
 
    e-chapbook

References

External links
Author's webpage
"Spark Wheel Press Author Interview: Steven D. Schroeder"
"The Journal Contributor Interview: Steven D. Schroeder", Matt Sumpter
"First Book Interview: Steven D. Schroeder", Keith Montesano
"BOR Contributor Interview: Steven D. Schroeder", Barn Owl Review, Mary Biddinger, Sara Tracey
"32 Poems Contributor Interview: Steven D. Schroeder", Savvy Verse & Wit, Serena Augusto-Cox
"Review of Torched Verse Ends", Galatea Resurrects, Kristin Berkey-Abbott

21st-century American poets
Living people
1977 births
Writers from San Francisco
Vanderbilt University alumni